Antonio Corvetta (born ) is a former Italian male volleyball player. He was part of the Italy men's national volleyball team. On club level he played for Altotevere Città di Castello.

Sporting achievements

Clubs

CEV Champions League
  2014/2015 - with Cucine Lube Civitanova
  2016/2017 - with Cucine Lube Civitanova

National championships
 2016/2017  Italian Championship, with Cucine Lube Civitanova

References

External links
 profile at FIVB.org

1977 births
Living people
Italian men's volleyball players
Place of birth missing (living people)